Tsar Kaloyan may refer to:

 Kaloyan of Bulgaria - emperor (tsar) of Bulgaria from 1197 to 1207
 Tsar Kaloyan, Razgrad Province - a town and municipality of the Razgrad Province in Bulgaria
 Tsar Kaloyan, Plovdiv Province - a village in the Kuklen municipality of the Plovdiv Province, Bulgaria